Fausto Pocar (born 1939) is an Italian jurist.  He is professor emeritus of  International Law at the University of Milan, where he also taught Private International Law and European Law, and where he served many years as Faculty Dean and Vice-Rector.  From 1984-2000, he was an elected member of the Human Rights Committee of the United Nations, serving as the committee's chair from 1991-92.

Pocar served in the Italian delegation to the UN General Assembly in New York and to the United Nations Commission on Human Rights in Geneva several times.  He also served as Italian delegate in the UNCOPUOS (UN Committee on the Peaceful Uses of Outer Space) and its Legal SubCommittee.

In 1999, he was appointed as a judge to the International Criminal Tribunal for the Former Yugoslavia (ICTY), and was Vice-President of the tribunal from November 2003 to November 2005, and President from November 2005 to November 2008. He was also a member of the Appeals Chamber of the International Criminal Tribunal for Rwanda (ICTR) from 2000 until the ICTR's closure in 2015, where he presided over many cases, including the one whereby the ICTR was closed.

In 2017, Pocar was appointed Judge ad hoc of the International Court of Justice (ICJ) in the case between Ukraine and the Russian Federation. As of 2012 Pocar is President of the International Institute of Humanitarian Law (Sanremo, Italy). Pocar is a doctor honoris causa of the University of Antwerp and of the Kennedy University of Buenos Aires. In 2014 he was made Cavaliere di Gran Croce (Great Cross Knight, the highest Italian honor) by the President of the Italian Republic.

His article, 'International Criminal Tribunals and Serious Violations of International Humanitarian Law against Civilians and Prisoner of War', was published in International Criminal Law and Human Rights, edited by Manoj Kumar Sinha (Manak Publications, New Delhi, 2010). He taught "Sistema de Derechos Humanos de las Naciones Unidas" at American University Washington College of Law’s Academy on Human Rights and Humanitarian Law as a visiting scholar in the summers of 2012-2015, and "Impunidad y justicia internacional" in the summers of 2016-2017.

References
International Criminal Tribunal for Rwanda

External links
 Lecture by Fausto Pocar entitled Completing the Mandate: The Legal Challenges Facing the International Criminal Tribunal for the former Yugoslavia in the Lecture Series of the United Nations Audiovisual Library of International Law
 Lecture by Fausto Pocar entitled Contribution of the International Criminal Tribunal for the former Yugoslavia to the Development of International Humanitarian Law in the Lecture Series of the United Nations Audiovisual Library of International Law
 Lecture by Fausto Pocar entitled The Progressive Blending of Legal Traditions in the Procedure of International Criminal Courts in the Lecture Series of the United Nations Audiovisual Library of International Law
 Introductory note by Fausto Pocar on the Statute of the International Criminal Tribunal for the former Yugoslavia in the Historic Archives of the United Nations Audiovisual Library of International Law

1939 births
Living people
20th-century Italian judges
21st-century Italian judges
International Criminal Tribunal for Rwanda judges
Presidents of the International Criminal Tribunal for the former Yugoslavia
Italian judges of United Nations courts and tribunals
Academic staff of the University of Milan
Members of the Institut de Droit International